Simone Berti (born 13 June 1985) is an Italian professional basketball player who plays for Angelico Biella of the Legadue Basket.

Achievements
 Italian League: 1
Montepaschi Siena: 2007–2008
 Italian Supercup: 1
Montepaschi Siena: 2007

References

External links
 Simone Berti at legabasket.it
 Simone Berti at legaduebasket.it
 Simone Berti at euroleague.net

1985 births
Living people
A.S. Junior Pallacanestro Casale players
Italian men's basketball players
Mens Sana Basket players
New Basket Brindisi players
Pallacanestro Biella players
Pallacanestro Cantù players
Pistoia Basket 2000 players
Sportspeople from Florence
Guards (basketball)